Aline Seitz (born 17 February 1997) is a Swiss racing cyclist, who currently rides for UCI Women's Continental Team Israel Premier Tech Roland Development 

Active on track, road and mountain bike, she is the Swiss champion of the Madison in 2017 and the Omnium in 2018. She rode in the women's scratch event at the 2018 UCI Track Cycling World Championships.

References

External links

1997 births
Living people
Swiss female cyclists
Place of birth missing (living people)
Cyclists at the 2019 European Games
European Games competitors for Switzerland
21st-century Swiss women